Sholavandan railway station, situated in the Southern Railway zone, is an Indian train station in Vadipatti taluk, a taluk in the Madurai district of Tamil Nadu. The station code is SDN.

Location and layout
Sholavandan is located on the left bank of the Vaigai River, sixteen miles north-west of Madurai. Sholavandan railway station is a stop for all passenger trains on the Madurai–Bangalore Express and the Nellai Express. It follows Samayanallur station on the route to Dindigul from Madurai. The nearest railway stations are:
 Koodal Nagar Railway Station, 
 Madurai Junction Railway Station, 
 Dindigul Junction railway station, 
 Palani/PLNI Railway Station, 

Lines 
The station has two intersecting lines: The BG single line towards the north via Chennai and Bangalore and the BG single line towards the south via Madurai and Kanyakumari.

See also
 Madurai Junction railway station
 Dindigul Junction railway station
 Kodaikanal Road railway station
 Tiruchirappalli Junction

References

Railway stations in Madurai district
Madurai railway division